Sepha is a genre of Thai poetic storytelling that had its origins in the performances of troubadours who stylized recitations were accompanied by two small sticks of wood (krap) to give rhythm and emphasis.  The etymology of the word sepha is disputed.

Origins
The sepha genre was developed by troubadours who recited episodes for local audiences, and passed on stories by word-of-mouth. By the eighteenth century, such performances had become the most popular form of entertainment in Siam. The troubadours told the story in stylized recitation, using two small sticks of wood (krap) to give rhythm and emphasis. The performances typically lasted a full night.  This genre later became known as sepha.

Etymology
The origin of the term Sepha is disputed. There is a musical form of the same name, but this seems unconnected. Kukrit Pramoj thought that sepha meant a jail and that the genre was developed by convicts in jail. Sujit Wongthet argued a connection to the Sanskrit word sewa, indicating some original association with ritual. The genre sepha was confined to episodes of Khun Chang Khun Phaen until the Fourth Reign (1851–1868), when parts of the royal chronicles and a few other works were rendered in this form on royal commission.

References
 Sepha Khun Chang Khun Phaen. 3 vols, Bangkok, Wachirayan Library, 1917–1918. Reprinted by Khurusapha. Includes Prince Damrong's preface on the history and background of the story.  A draft translation of the preface is available.
 
 

Epic poetry
Thai culture
Thai poetry
Cultural history of Thailand